Francis Charles Hastings Russell, 9th Duke of Bedford KG (16 October 1819 – 14 January 1891) was an English politician and agriculturalist.

Life

Known as Hastings, the 9th Duke was born in Curzon Street, London, the son of Major-General Lord George William Russell and Lady William Russell, and the grandson of John Russell, 6th Duke of Bedford. He was commissioned into the Scots Fusilier Guards in 1838, retiring in 1844. He was Liberal Member of Parliament for Bedfordshire from 1847 until 1872, when he succeeded to the dukedom on the death of his cousin William Russell, 8th Duke of Bedford, and took his place in the House of Lords. In 1886, he broke with the party leadership of William Ewart Gladstone over the First Irish Home Rule Bill and became a Unionist.

He took an active interest in agriculture and experimentation on his Woburn Abbey estate and was President of the Royal Agricultural Society in 1880. On 1 December 1880, he was made a Knight of the Garter. From 1884 until his death he was Lord Lieutenant of Huntingdonshire.

He died in 1891, aged 71 at 81 Eaton Square, London, by shooting himself as a result of insanity, while suffering from pneumonia. After being cremated at Woking Crematorium, his ashes were buried at the Bedford Chapel of St. Michael's Church in Chenies, Buckinghamshire.

Marriage and issue
He married Lady Elizabeth Sackville-West, daughter of George Sackville-West, 5th Earl De La Warr, in Buckhurst Park on 18 January 1844. They had four children: 
 George William Francis Sackville Russell, 10th Duke of Bedford (1852–1893)
 Lady Ella Monica Sackville Russell (1854–1936), died unmarried.
 Lady Ermyntrude Sackville Russell (1856–1927), married Edward Malet, 4th Bt.
 Herbrand Arthur Russell, 11th Duke of Bedford (1858–1940)

References

 "Burke's Peerage and Baronetage"

Bibliography
 Lloyd, E. M. & Seccombe, T. "Russell, Lord George William (1790–1846)", rev. James Falkner, Oxford Dictionary of National Biography, Oxford University Press, 2004

External links
 

1819 births
1891 deaths
English agriculturalists
Scots Guards officers
409
Knights of the Garter
Liberal Party (UK) MPs for English constituencies
Lord-Lieutenants of Huntingdonshire
Russell, Francis
Russell, Francis
Russell, Francis
Russell, Francis
Russell, Francis
Russell, Francis
Russell, Francis
Bedford, D9
F
Liberal Party (UK) hereditary peers
Liberal Unionist Party peers
Suicides by firearm in England
British politicians who committed suicide